Posavska Mahala is a village in the municipality of Odžak, Bosnia and Herzegovina.

Demographics 
According to the 2013 census, its population was 849.

References

Populated places in Odžak